Sheila Mills  (born 27 July 1949) was a Labor member of the Parliament of Western Australia.

Mills was a member of the Western Australian Legislative Council for South Metropolitan.  She was elected to the Thirty-seventh Parliament on 26 February 2005 for a term beginning 22 May 2005. Her term ended in 2009.

Committees
Standing Committee on Uniform Legislation and General Purposes: 26 May 2005 – 17 August 2005.
Standing Committee on Uniform Legislation and Statutes Review: 17 August 2005 – 21 May 2009.
Parliamentary Services Committee: 17 August 2005 – 21 May 2009.
Member, Parliamentary Services Committee: 17 August 2005 – 21 May 2009.

References

Members of the Western Australian Legislative Council
1949 births
Living people
Australian Labor Party members of the Parliament of Western Australia
21st-century Australian politicians
Women members of the Western Australian Legislative Council
21st-century Australian women politicians